Carmine Tucci (27 December 1933 – 25 February 1990) was an Italian ice hockey player. He competed in the men's tournament at the 1956 Winter Olympics.

References

External links
 

1933 births
1990 deaths
Olympic ice hockey players of Italy
Ice hockey players at the 1956 Winter Olympics
Ice hockey people from Bolzano